Gochujang or red chili paste is a savory, sweet, and spicy fermented condiment popular in Korean cooking. It is made from gochu-garu (chili powder), glutinous rice, meju (fermented soybean) powder, yeotgireum (barley malt powder), and salt. The sweetness comes from the starch of cooked glutinous rice, cultured with saccharifying enzymes during the fermentation process. Traditionally, it has been naturally fermented over years in jangdok (earthenware) on an elevated stone platform, called jangdokdae, in the backyard.

The Sunchang Gochujang Festival is held annually in Gochujang Village in Sunchang County, North Jeolla Province, South Korea.

History 
It has commonly been assumed that spicy  varieties were made using black peppers and  before the introduction of chili peppers. The second-oldest documentation of pepper paste is found in the 1433 Korean book Collected Prescriptions of Native Korean Medicines. Pepper paste is again mentioned in a 1445 medical encyclopedia named Compendia of Medical Prescriptions.

Chili peppers, which originated in the Americas, were introduced to East Asia by Portuguese traders in the early 16th century. The first mention of chili pepper in Korea is found in Collected Essays of Jibong, an encyclopedia published in 1614. Farm Management, a book from ca. 1700, discussed the cultivation methods of chili peppers.

It is also mentioned that Sunchang was renowned for its gochujang production. China and Japan, the countries with which Korea has historically shared the most culture and trade, do not include gochujang in their traditional cuisines.

Ingredients

Gochujang's primary ingredients are red chili powder (gochugaru; 고추가루), glutinous rice powder, powdered fermented soybeans, and salt. Korean chili peppers, of the species Capsicum annuum, are spicy yet sweet making them ideal for gochujang production.

Other recipes use glutinous rice (chapssal), normal short-grain rice (mepssal), or barley, and, less frequently, whole wheat kernels, jujubes, pumpkin, and sweet potato; these ingredients are used to make special variations. A small amount of sweetener, such as sugar, syrup, or honey, is also sometimes added. The finished product is a dark, reddish paste with a rich, piquant flavor.

The making of gochujang at home began tapering off when commercial production came into the mass market in the early 1970s. Now, most Koreans purchase gochujang at grocery stores or markets. It is still used extensively in Korean cooking to flavor stews (jjigae), such as in gochujang jjigae; to marinate meat, such as in gochujang bulgogi; and as a condiment for naengmyeon and bibimbap.

Gochujang is also used as a base for making other condiments, such as chogochujang and ssamjang. Chogochujang is a variant of gochujang made by adding vinegar and other seasonings, such as sugar and sesame seeds. It is usually used as a sauce for hoe and hoedeopbap. Similarly, ssamjang is a mixture of mainly gochujang and doenjang, with chopped onions and other spicy seasonings, and it is popular with sangchussam.

Gochujang hot-taste unit 
Gochujang hot-taste unit (GHU) is a unit of measurement for the pungency (spicy heat) of gochujang, based on the gas chromatography and the high-performance liquid chromatography of capsaicin and dihydrocapsaicin concentrations.

Gochujang products are assigned to one of the five levels of spiciness: Mild, Slight Hot, Medium Hot, Very Hot, and Extreme Hot.

Uses
Gochujang is used in various dishes such as bibimbap and tteokbokki, and in salads, stews, soups, and marinated meat dishes. Gochujang may make dishes spicier (depending on the capsaicin in the base chili), but also can make dishes sweeter and smokier.

Storage 
Leave the lid open overnight and cover the next day. It is better to use a jar with a narrow neck. When gochujang is exposed to the air, it turns black and develops a bad taste. In summer, it can easily become moldy, so cover the pot with mesh or gauze while it is in the sun.

See also

 Doenjang
 Ssamjang
 Chili pepper paste
 Biber salçası
 Filfel chuma
 Harissa
 Jeow bong
 Doubanjiang
 Sambal
 Sriracha
 Yuzukoshō
 Zhug
 Fermented bean paste
 Ají (sauce)

References

Chili paste
Fermented soy-based foods
Korean condiments
Korean words and phrases